Sopka is a rural locality (a settlement) in Severodvinsk Urban Okrug, Arkhangelsk Oblast, Russia. The population was 510 as of 2010.

References 

Rural localities in Severodvinsk Urban Okrug
Severodvinsk Urban Okrug